Foltz is an extinct town in Berkeley County, in the U.S. state of West Virginia.

History
A post office called Foltz was established in 1890, and remained in operation until 1907. Reverend C. W. Foltz, an early postmaster, gave the community his family name.

References

Landforms of Berkeley County, West Virginia
1890 establishments in West Virginia
1907 disestablishments in West Virginia